Metataenia is a genus of beetles in the family Buprestidae, containing the following species:

 Metataenia artensis (Montrouzier, 1860)
 Metataenia aurofoveata (Saunders, 1869)
 Metataenia aurora (Obenberger, 1932)
 Metataenia capitata (Kerremans, 1903)
 Metataenia clotildae (Gestro, 1876)
 Metataenia deplanchei (Fauvel, 1891)
 Metataenia erythrocephala (Montrouzier, 1860)
 Metataenia flavofoveata (Saunders, 1869)
 Metataenia foveicollis (Saunders, 1869)
 Metataenia freyi Théry, 1943
 Metataenia gilvogeniculata Hoscheck, 1931
 Metataenia gratiosissima (Kerremans, 1909)
 Metataenia hauseri (Obenberger, 1928)
 Metataenia hoscheki (Obenberger, 1916)
 Metataenia hudsoni Nylander, 2010
 Metataenia loriae (Kerremans, 1895)
 Metataenia marginipennis (Saunders, 1869)
 Metataenia meeki (Kerremans, 1919)
 Metataenia pagdeni Théry, 1943
 Metataenia purpurascens Théry, 1923
 Metataenia quadrimaculata Théry, 1923
 Metataenia quadriplagis (Obenberger, 1928)
 Metataenia quadristigmosa (Obenberger, 1928)
 Metataenia rothschildi (Théry, 1923)
 Metataenia sexmaculata (Laporte & Gory, 1836)
 Metataenia varennesi (Montrouzier, 1860)

References

Buprestidae genera